Perugia San Francesco d'Assisi – Umbria International Airport , formerly Perugia Sant'Egidio Airport, is an airport serving Perugia, the capital city of the region of Umbria in central Italy.

Facilities
It was expanded in 2011, with the addition of new terminal facilities designed by the Italian architect Gae Aulenti and part-funded by a government grant awarded to celebrate the 150th anniversary of the unification of Italy.

Airlines and destinations
The following airlines operate regular scheduled and charter flights at Perugia Airport:

Statistics

Ground Transportation

By Car

Perugia Airport is reachable northbound and southbound by the E45-SS3 Bis (Ravenna-Cesena-Perugia-Terni) from the "Ospedalicchio" exit.

By Train

The nearest railway stations to the airport are Perugia (also known locally as Perugia Fontivegge), Perugia Ponte San Giovanni, and Bastia Umbra.

By Bus

The Airport is served by a limited number of services by the following regional bus routes operated by Busitalia Umbria (formerly by APM (1996-2010) and Umbria Mobilità (2010-2014)):

E007 Perugia-Petrignano-Assisi (2 departures in each direction);
E422 Perugia-Santa Maria degli Angeli-Foligno (2 departures in each directions)

The fares are €2,50 (for Perugia),
€3,00 (for Assisi) and €4,20 (for Foligno) for tickets bought before travelling, and are incremented by €1,00 should the tickets be purchased on board the bus.

Alternatively, there is a shuttle bus (by ACAP-Sulga) between Perugia Railway Station and City Centre, which must be booked in advance of your travel date. A single journey costs €8,00, while a return one is €14,00

By Taxi

Perugia Taxi, the main public taxi consortium in the city, operates taxi services to/from Perugia (approximately €30-40), Bastia Umbra (approximately €20), and Assisi (fixed fare €30).

References

External links

 Aeroporto Internazionale dell'Umbria Perugia San Francesco d'Assisi, official site
 
 

Airports in Italy
Transport in Umbria
Buildings and structures in Perugia